Feodor Alexander Asmussen (18 June 1887–1961) was a Danish architect. His works ranged from villas, to bank buildings and factories. He designed the City Hall in Hjorring in 1919 winning 3rd prize in a competition.

See also
List of Danish architects

References

Danish architects
1887 births
1961 deaths